Dimitris Gogos (28 February 190318 November 1985) was one of the most influential singers and composers of rebetiko music. Also called Bayianteras, a nickname that was given to him in 1925 for covering and playing in bouzouki Emmerich Kálmán's operetta, Die Bajadere, Gogos wrote songs that met great success and popularity in occupied Greece.

1903 births
1985 deaths
20th-century Greek male singers
Greek bouzouki players
Musicians from Piraeus